Robert Edward Travaglini (born July 20, 1952 in Massachusetts) is an American politician and lobbyist.  From 2003 to 2007,  Travaglini served as President of the Massachusetts Senate. He represented the first Middlesex and Suffolk senate district, encompassing portions of Boston, Cambridge, Revere, and Winthrop.

Career
Travaglini began his career as an executive assistant to then Massachusetts Attorney General Francis X. Bellotti from 1975 to 1981, followed by a three-year stint as administrative assistant to Boston's Mayor Kevin White.

After earning experience as an assistant, Travaglini entered the political world in the 1983 election for the Boston City Council. He was elected as the councilor for District 1, and was subsequently re-elected to four two-year terms. In November 1992, Travaglini was elected to the Massachusetts Senate, and served both as a state senator and city council member during 1993.

In 1999, Travaglini moved up in rank to Majority Whip of the Senate. He reached the pinnacle of his political career in 2003, when he was elected as President of the Massachusetts Senate. Travaglini was the first Italian-American to lead either legislative branch in Massachusetts.

Travaglini resigned from the senate position in 2007, in order to start a lobbying firm, Travaglini Eisenberg Kiley, and later one called Travaglini Scorzoni Kiley.

Education
Travaglini attended Savio Preparatory High School in East Boston and then continued on to Boston State College, where he earned a Bachelor of Science in Political Science in 1974.

Personal life
Travaglini, a longtime resident of East Boston, now resides in Winthrop. He is married to Kelly (née Holtz) and has three children: Taylor; Jennifer; and Andrew. His brother, Michael, was an unsuccessful candidate for an at-large City Council seat in 1993.

In 2008, Travaglini spent $30,000 on an oil-on-canvas portrait by Boston-based artist Thomas Ouellette, which now hangs in the Senate Reading Room of the Massachusetts State House, alongside former Senate Presidents such as Calvin Coolidge and Horace Mann. As of 2008, only eleven Senate Presidents have portraits in the State House.

See also
 1991–1992 Massachusetts legislature
 1993–1994 Massachusetts legislature
 1995–1996 Massachusetts legislature
 1997–1998 Massachusetts legislature
 1999–2000 Massachusetts legislature
 2001–2002 Massachusetts legislature
 2003–2004 Massachusetts legislature
 2005–2006 Massachusetts legislature

References 

Living people
1952 births
People from East Boston, Boston
American people of Italian descent
Boston State College alumni
Boston City Council members
Democratic Party Massachusetts state senators
Presidents of the Massachusetts Senate
American lobbyists
20th-century American politicians
21st-century American politicians